Meera Menon is an Indian–American director, writer, and editor. Her feature directorial debut, Farah Goes Bang, screened at the Tribeca Film Festival in 2013 and was awarded the inaugural Nora Ephron Prize by Tribeca and Vogue. She currently resides in Los Angeles.

Early life 
Menon hails from Palakkad district of Kerala, India. Menon cited her father Vijayan, a film producer and a founder of Tara Arts, an English cultural ambassador for South India that showcases musicals and films, as her earliest inspiration for filmmaking, using his camera to shoot films at a young age with her next-door neighbour. Menon says while her parents encouraged her to pursue the arts, her father advised her to look at it as a hobby.

Because of this way of thinking about film, Menon did not seriously consider filmmaking as a career until she attended Columbia University, and took classes that were taught by professional filmmakers. Menon received a BA in English and Art History from Columbia, but while she was there, she began directing films and discovered a passion for the craft. She went on to receive an MFA from the USC School of Cinematic Arts.

Career 
In 2009, Menon wrote and directed the short film Mark in Argentina, a story about a governor searching for his mistress in Argentina. However, it wasn't until Menon released her feature-length debut that she started to get a great deal of recognition from the media.

Menon's first full-length feature film, Farah Goes Bang, was described by Jennifer Mills as one that, "explores many genres: the road movie, the sexual coming of age movie, the political film, the buddy movie." Menon co-wrote the film with Laura Goode, who also acted as a producer. Not only did Menon win the Nora Ephron Prize for Farah Goes Bang, but the film also won awards at the Los Angeles Asian Pacific Film Festival and CAAMFest.

In 2015, Menon directed the female-driven Wall Street drama Equity. The film premiered in Competition at the 2016 Sundance Film Festival.

In 2016, Menon also wrote and directed the short film The Press Conference for Refinery29's ShatterBox Anthology, a series of 12 shorts written and directed by women. The short premiered on Refinery29's website on 23 September 2016.

She had also worked as a director on the TV series The Magicians for an episode in the third, and two in the fourth season.

Filmography 

TV series

References

External links 
 
 
 Elephant Shoes Pictures
 Interview with the Believer

Living people
American film directors of Indian descent
American people of Indian descent
American women film directors
American women writers of Indian descent
American screenwriters of Indian descent
American women screenwriters
Columbia College (New York) alumni
Year of birth missing (living people)
USC School of Cinematic Arts alumni
American women film producers